Aeolochroma viridicata is a moth of the family Geometridae first described by Thomas Pennington Lucas in 1890. It is found in Australian states of New South Wales and Queensland. Adultsts have a complex green and brown or grey pattern.

References

Moths described in 1890
Pseudoterpnini
Moths of Australia